Faruhad Ismail (born 7 May 1979) is a footballer from the Maldives. He made his first appearance for the Maldives national football team in 2011.

External links 
 ފަރޭ އެނބުރި ފުޓްބޯޅައަށް، މިފަހަރު ޔުނައިޓެޑް ވިކްޓަރީއަށް at Sun Sports
 އެންމެ ގިނަ ކްލަބަށް ކުޅުނު ޑިފެންޑަރު ކޯޗެއްގެ ގޮތުގައި ވިދަނީ at Fahuminet

References 

1979 births
Living people
Maldivian footballers
Maldives international footballers
Association football defenders
Footballers at the 2006 Asian Games
Club Green Streets players
United Victory players
Asian Games competitors for the Maldives
Club Eagles players